Kondakov is a Russian masculine surname, its feminine counterpart is Kondakova. 

People
Boris Kondakov (born 1954), Russian philologist
Daria Kondakova (born 1991), Russian rhythmic gymnast
Denis Kondakov (born 1978), Russian football player
Ivan Kondakov (1857–1931), Russian chemist 
Nikodim Kondakov (1844–1925), Russian art historian
Pavel Kondakov (born 1972), Russian football player
Sofya Kondakova (born 1922), Soviet speed skater
Yegor Kondakov (born 1998), Russian football player 
Yelena Kondakova (born 1957), Russian cosmonaut 
Yuliya Kondakova (born 1981), Russian hurdler
Yuri Kondakov (born 1951), Russian/Ukrainian speed skater

Other
Kondakov Plateau, Yakutia
Kondakov Seminar
7106 Kondakov, a minor planet

See also
Kondakovo

Russian-language surnames